"Down" is a song by the American rock band Blink-182, released to radio on May 10, 2004, as the third single from the group's  2003 untitled album. The song peaked at number 10 on Billboard Modern Rock Tracks chart.

Background
The song revolves around longing in a relationship, set to a rain-drenched soundscape. The original version of "Down" ran over six minutes long, and contained a drum and bass breakdown from drummer Travis Barker. Rumors circulated following the song's release that DeLonge penned the track on experiences with a previous girlfriend.

It is one of the few Blink-182 songs to feature vocal contributions from Travis Barker, who provides the whispered lines before the choruses.

Release and live performances
"Down" was issued as a single in May 2004, and the band promoted the release with tour dates featuring Cypress Hill and on a nationwide tour with No Doubt. The single was a mixed success, peaking at number 10 on the Billboard Modern Rock Tracks chart during the week of July 31, 2004, but quickly falling off afterward. The song also peaked at number 24 on the UK Singles Chart.

"Down" was one of few Blink-182 songs performed by Tom DeLonge's next band, Angels & Airwaves. During an August 2009 concert in Hartford, CT, the band dedicated the song to Adam Goldstein (DJ AM), who had died the night before following a drug overdose.

Music video
The song's music video was directed by Mr. Scandalous, and made its premiere on MTV on June 2, 2004. In the clip, Blink-182 are playing a house party when the police arrive and search for a gang member named Trouble, who slips away immediately. The cops, fronted by a lead policeman played by actor Terry Crews, unsuccessfully chase Trouble on foot, in cars, and in helicopters throughout South Central Los Angeles, but he evades their capture in the concrete L.A. River. The party scene features over 100 former gang members; these performers were signed to Suspect Entertainment, a company founded to provide a safe, legal alternative to joining such groups.

Track listing

 T.L.A. stands for Tom Lord-Alge
 Side 2 of the Picture Disc contains artwork and information, not music
 The "behind the scenes" video is the same one featured on the "Blink-182" Tour Edition DVD and the "Greatest Hits" Deluxe DVD

Charts

Personnel

Blink-182
 Mark Hoppus - bass, vocals
 Tom Delonge - lead vocals, guitar
 Travis Barker - drums, backing vocals

Additional musicians
 Roger Joseph Manning, Jr. - keyboards

Release history

References

External links
 

Blink-182 songs
2004 singles
Songs written by Tom DeLonge
Songs written by Travis Barker
Songs written by Mark Hoppus
2003 songs
Geffen Records singles